The 2017–18 Portland State Vikings men's basketball team represented Portland State University during the 2017–18 NCAA Division I men's basketball season. The Vikings, led by first-year head coach Barret Peery, played their home games at Pamplin Sports Center in Portland, Oregon, as members of the Big Sky Conference. They finished the season 20–14, 9–9 in Big Sky play to finish in a tie for sixth place. They defeated Sacramento State in the first round of the Big Sky tournament before losing in the quarterfinals to Eastern Washington. They were invited to the CollegeInsider.com Tournament where, after a first round bye, lost in the second round to San Diego.

Previous season
The Vikings finished the 2016–17 season 15–16, 7–11 in Big Sky play to finish in a tie for eighth place. As the No. 8 seed in the Big Sky tournament, they defeated Northern Arizona in the first round, then lost to North Dakota in the quarterfinals.

Offseason

Departures

Incoming transfers

2017 recruiting class

Roster

Schedule and results

|-
!colspan=9 style=| Exhibition

|-
!colspan=9 style=| Non-conference regular season

|-
!colspan=9 style=| Big Sky regular season

|-
!colspan=9 style=| Big Sky tournament

|-
!colspan=9 style=| CIT

See also
2017–18 Portland State Vikings women's basketball team

Notes

References

Portland State Vikings men's basketball seasons
Portland State
Portland State Vikings men's basketball
Portland State Vikings men's basketball
Portland State